Coleophora gallurella is a moth of the family Coleophoridae. It is found on Sardinia.

The larvae feed on the leaves of Echium italicum.

References

gallurella
Moths described in 1951
Endemic fauna of Italy
Moths of Europe